Justo Domínguez was a Cuban pitcher in the Negro leagues in the 1920s.

Domínguez played for the Cuban Stars (West) in 1925, and had previously played for the Habana club of the Cuban League.

References

External links
 and Seamheads

Year of birth missing
Year of death missing
Place of birth missing
Place of death missing
Cuban Stars (West) players
Habana players
Cuban baseball players
Baseball pitchers